Control Z is a Mexican teen drama streaming television series created by Carlos Quintanilla Sakar, Adriana Pelusi and Miguel García Moreno and developed by Lemon Studios for Netflix, that premiered on Netflix on 22 May 2020. The show stars Ana Valeria Becerril, Michael Ronda, Yankel Stevan and Zión Moreno. Shortly after its release, the series was renewed for a second season on 29 May 2020. Season 2 was released on 4 August 2021 and later that month, the series was renewed for a third and final season, which was released on 6 July 2022.

Premise
During an assembly at Colegio Nacional (National School), a hacker exposes a student as transgender, outing and causing her panic and humiliation. The next day, the hacker reveals more students' secrets which causes numerous teens to turn on one another. Sofía Herrera, an introverted teenager, tries to uncover who this hacker is before the dirt on her becomes public.

Cast and characters

Main
 Ana Valeria Becerril as Sofía Herrera, her love interests was Raúl and now Javier. She is a very observant and quiet student, often seen as an outsider by her peers and when secrets are revealed, she sets out to investigate who the hacker is. She is smart and very justice-driven, but normally has to keep the peace between Raúl and Javier and she suffers from mental health problems due to her family situation.
 Michael Ronda as Javier Williams, the new student and a love interest of Sofía. He quickly makes friends with Sofía on his first day at National School. He expresses romantic feelings for Sofía throughout the season and has a rivalry with Raúl, usually over the investigation and Sofía. He is the son of a retired footballer, Damian Williams, but refuses the coach's requests for him to play for the school team due to trauma from accidentally murdering a teammate from his former high school.
 Yankel Stevan as Raúl León, a love interest of Sofía. Just like Javier he expresses romantic feelings for Sofía throughout the season. He comes from quite a wealthy family and is initially one of the popular kids but later helps Sofía track down the hacker. He strongly dislikes Javier.
 Zión Moreno as Isabela de la Fuente (season 1), a transgender student and former girlfriend of Pablo. She was the most popular girl in the school and was liked by many boys, but after it was revealed that she was trans, she got harassed by multiple students and dumped by Pablo.
 Luis Curiel as Luis Navarro, a quiet student who enjoys drawing. He is often bullied by Gerry, Ernesto and Dario, but is helped by Sofía and Javier.
 Samantha Acuña as Alejandra "Alex" Salomone, an openly yet socially distant lesbian student who is in a forbidden relationship with her Biology teacher Gabriela and is talented with computers.
 Macarena García Romero as Natalia Alexander, one of the popular students, twin sister of María and one of Isabela's former best friends. She was in charge of organizing the NONA event until the secret about her using money raised from it in order to buy expensive items for herself was exposed. She is very self-centred, focused, and goes to extreme lengths to achieve what she wants.
 Fiona Palomo as María Alexander, the twin sister of Natalia and another of Isabela's former best friends who is secretly having a fling with Pablo behind her back. She is often her sister's sidekick, but is nicer to people and always tries to make her friends happy. She feels guilty about being with Pablo while he was dating Isabela.
 Andrés Baida as Pablo García, one of the popular students and ex-boyfriend of Isabela. He dumped Isabela in front of the school after she was exposed for being trans, but tries to reconcile with her multiple times later, despite cheating with María. He is loyal to his friends and encourages Gerry to stop bullying Luis, but is revealed to be an unfaithful boyfriend. In season 2, he is the most unforgiving of the student body when Raúl returns to the school despite his actions as the hacker that he incessantly uses violence as a mean to make him pay for everything he did, even after finding out that he's been hiding Gerry, who is wanted by the police for murdering Luis. He also tries unsuccessfully to reconcile with María for acting indifferently over her pregnancy.
 Patricio Gallardo as Gerardo "Gerry" Granda, a former student at National School and ex-boyfriend of Rosita. He is a closeted sexually curious but ideally heterosexual boy who is exposed for watching gay pornography. He constantly bullied Luis along with his minions, Darío and Ernesto, and crosses the line when he sends Luis into a coma. He is very aggressive and bottles up a lot of anger and insecurity inside, but is shown to be empathetic and regrets his mistreatment of Luis.
 Iván Aragón as Darío, one of Gerry's minions
 Xabiani Ponce de León as Ernesto, another of Gerry's minions
 Paty Maqueo as Rosa "Rosita" Restrepo, Gerry's ex-girlfriend who breaks up with him after his secret is exposed. She takes over as the organizer of the NONA after Natalia is revealed to be stealing the money.
 Rodrigo Cachero as Miguel Quintanilla, the former principal of National School. He is dating Sofía's mother and proposes, but is rejected. He has sex with Susana in spitefulness. In season 2, he is engaged to Nora until she breaks it off after his affair with Susana comes to light.
 Rocío Verdejo as Nora, Sofía's mother, who is distrustful of her daughter's decisions and the people she hangs out with after her father's supposed death.
 Mauro Sánchez Navarro as Bruno (season 1; recurring season 3), the person in charge of technology at the school who assists the hacker in revealing the secrets of the students. He returns to get revenge on Raúl and the others for making his stay in jail a very horrific one by threatening to expose their involvement in Susana's death.
 Lidia San José as Gabriela, a Biology teacher who is fired from National School after her relationship with Alex is exposed. She later moves to Spain for a job opportunity.
 Thanya López as Susana, one of the teachers at National School. She later becomes the new principal in season 2.
 Renata del Castillo as Lulú, Quintanilla's secretary at National School.
 Arturo Barba as Fernando/Rogelio Herrera, Sofía's father and Nora's husband who fakes his own death. It is later revealed in season 3 that he has another family.
 Kariam Castro as Valeria, a mean student who makes fun of Isabela after her secret is exposed.
 Ariana Saavedra as Regina, Valeria's friend.
 Ana Sofía Gatica as Claudia (seasons 2–3), María's friend and love interest. She had issues with Pablo due to his previous behaviour, before the two put their differences aside to help rescue Natalia when she is kidnapped. They later become friends.
 Cristian Santin as Antonio Segovia "El Güero" (seasons 2–3; recurring season 1), the former P.E. teacher.
 Sandra Burgos as Marta, Luis's mother (seasons 2–3; recurring season 1)
 Pierre Louis as Felipe "Pipe" (season 2; guest season 3), a handsome man Gerry falls in love with while he hides from the police.

Recurring
 Alexander Holtmann as Lalo de la Fuente (season 1), Isabela's father
 Nastassia Villasana as Bety de la Fuente (season 1), Isabela's mother
 Marco Zunino as Damián Williams, Javier's father and a retired footballer
 Susana Lozano as Gerry's mother (seasons 1–2)
 Ricardo Crespo as Gerry's father (seasons 1–2)
 Daniela Zavala as Alondra de León (season 1), Raúl's mother
 Alejandro Ávila as Roberto de León (season 1), Raúl's father
 Rodrigo Mejía as Natalia's father (seasons 1–2)
 Citlali Galindo as Natalia's mother
 Fabián Mejía as Salvador (season 1)
 Cuitlahuac Santoyo as Gibrán
 Pablo de la Rosa as Jordi (season 1; guest season 2)
 David Montalvo as Joaquín (season 1) and Bernardo (season 3)
 Diana Carreiro as Daniela (season 3), a new student at the Colegio Nacional who wants to belong to the “masked sect” and will bring out her most evil side
 Carmen Beato as Elvia (season 3), the new principal at National School following Susana's death
 Gina Varela as Ana (season 3), Pablo's mother

Episodes

Season 1 (2020)

Season 2 (2021)

Season 3 (2022)

Notes

References

External links
 
 

2020 Mexican television series debuts
2022 Mexican television series endings
2020s high school television series
2020s LGBT-related drama television series
2020s teen drama television series
Mexican drama television series
Mexican LGBT-related television shows
Spanish-language Netflix original programming
Television series about bullying
Television series about teenagers
Television series produced by Lemon Films
Transgender-related television shows
Works about computer hacking
Television series about social media